This article documents the situation of the COVID-19 pandemic in the province of Heilongjiang, China. The first confirmed COVID-19 case in the province occurred in Mudanjiang on 21 January 2020, and though confirmed COVID-19 cases had begun to plateau by early March, by late March, international arrivals, largely from the neighboring Russian Far East, had added hundreds of cases to the province's total, leading to measures such as closed community management in Suifenhe on 8 April.

Statistics

References 

Heilongjiang
Heilongjiang
Health in Heilongjiang
History of Heilongjiang